Xenophallus umbratilis is a species of poeciliid fish native to the countries of Nicaragua and Costa Rica.  This species grows to a length of  SL.  It is the only known member of its genus.

References
 

Poeciliidae
Freshwater fish of Central America
Fish of Costa Rica
Fish of Nicaragua
Fish described in 1912
Taxa named by Seth Eugene Meek